"Here and Now" and "You'll Be Sorry" are two songs by British pop group Steps. Both tracks appear their third studio album, Buzz (2000). Released on 4 June 2001, the songs were the band's fourth double A-side single. In Europe, the song "Here and Now" was released alongside "Summer of Love" instead. The single reached number four in the United Kingdom and number 23 in Ireland.

Both songs were remixed for their single release, with the official titles of the Q-Street Mix (also called the Soundtrade Mix) and The Pardon Mix; which is similar to the album version but with a hard ending instead of a fade out.

Chart performance
Although widely advertised as being released on 28 May 2001, the single was pushed back and released on 4 June 2001. The double A-side debuted and peaked at number four on the UK Singles Chart and spent 10 weeks in the top 75. Despite its chart success, it ended up as one of Steps' lowest-selling singles.

Music video
The concept was notable for the fact that the videos for the two songs linked together. The video for "Here And Now" features the group making their way through a maze, until they reach the centre and perform the song's dance routine. At the end of the song, the centre of the maze morphs into a spaceship which then flies off.

The video for "You'll Be Sorry" takes place aboard the spaceship. A competition was held through the official Steps website for fans to be filmed and appear in the video for "You'll Be Sorry", which was recorded in Acton, London. The 30-some competition winners were filmed dancing around the centre stage whilst Steps performed their dance routine to the chorus of the song. However, none of the footage made it to the final cut, disappointing the competition winners.

In May 2022, the raw footage from the "You'll Be Sorry" video shoot was released on Steps' official YouTube channel showing the footage of the competition winners officially for the first time in 21 years. Co-director Marek Losey explained in an interview on the same channel that the footage was ultimately not included due to time pressure. There was to have been additional footage of the fans entering the video set, but it was not shot.

Track listings

UK CD1
 "Here and Now" (Q-Street mix)
 "Here and Now" (Sleazesisters Anthem mix)
 "You'll Be Sorry" (W.I.P. Bach to Classics mix)

UK CD2
 "You'll Be Sorry" (The Pardon mix)
 "Here and Now" (Almighty mix)
 "Just Like the First Time"

UK cassette single
 "Here and Now" (Q-Street mix)
 "You'll Be Sorry" (The Pardon mix)
 "Here and Now" (Almighty mix)

Australian and New Zealand CD single
 "Here and Now" (Soundtrade mix)
 "Here and Now" (Sleazesisters Anthem mix)
 "Here and Now" (Almighty mix)
 "You'll Be Sorry" (The Pardon mix)
 "You'll Be Sorry" (W.I.P. Bach to Classics mix)
 "Just Like the First Time"

Personnel

"Here and Now"
 Lee Latchford-Evans – lead and backing vocals
 Claire Richards – lead and backing vocals
 Lisa Scott-Lee – lead and backing vocals
 Faye Tozer – lead and backing vocals
 Ian "H" Watkins – lead and backing vocals

"You'll Be Sorry"
 Ian "H" Watkins – lead and backing vocals
 Claire Richards – lead and backing vocals
 Lisa Scott-Lee – lead and backing vocals
 Lee Latchford-Evans – backing vocals
 Faye Tozer – backing vocals

Charts

Weekly charts

Year-end charts

Release history

References

2000 songs
2001 singles
Jive Records singles
Pete Waterman Entertainment singles
Song recordings produced by Quiz & Larossi
Steps (group) songs